Euphony Communications Ltd was a privately owned multi-level marketing company based in High Wycombe and then Reading, UK.  It originally sold products and services in the communications market. Euphony was founded in 1998 by the US-born Dan Robison Sr., following the success of a similar enterprise in the US, who appointed his son Dan Robison Jr. to be an employed CEO.  It implemented a multi-level marketing scheme to attract resellers, who were then rewarded for both recruitment and sales. Euphony sold telephony services by agreement with Cable & Wireless Telecoms, on a special business-to-business tariff, which was then marked up to the end-customer, while maintaining competitive prices and attractive pricing. Euphony has featured in UK national newspapers, which have referenced its rapid expansion and success since it was bought by Giles Redpath who took over as CEO in 2004 to set the company in the right direction, expanded it to sell products and services in the communications and utility markets, and relocated it to Basingstoke, UK. The shares are held thus; Giles Redpath (53%), Penta Capital (35%), management (2%), others (10%).

Services
Euphony offers telephone, broadband, VOIP, and gas & electricity services in eight European countries including the UK, Ireland, Belgium, Netherlands, Germany, Spain, Portugal and the Czech Republic to both consumer and small business customers. An online casino and bingo service called euPLAY was released in July 2008; this system allows anyone to set up their own online casino for free and earn commissions from gameplays from their own players and also the players of anyone they introduce. An online sign up facility for Euphony's utility services will be launched in mid July 2009.

History
In February 2008, Euphony was listed as 13th in the Sunday Times Buyout Track 100, the list of the 100 privately owned companies with the fastest-growing profits, with 80.91% annual profit growth.

Euphony Communications Ltd went into administration in 2009.
Business was transferred to Hive Communications in 2010.

In December 2009, the Belgian Management Team performed a Management Buy Out of the business operating in Belgium and The Netherlands and continue to operate as a reseller of services.
These services include Mobile, Fixed line telephone, Internet, Gas, Electric, Solar power, Digitale Television, Central heating and Credit cards.

References

External links 
Euphony corporate website (Europe)
Euphony corporate website (UK)
Raniston Athletic FC – sponsored by Euphony

Companies established in 1998